Myriopteris wootonii, formerly known as Cheilanthes wootonii, is a species of fern in the Pteridaceae family (subfamily Cheilanthoideae) with the common name Wooton's lace fern.

Description
Myriopteris wootonii grows fronds from a long creeping rhizome with tan to brown scales. The frond (leaf) is 10-20 cm long and 2-3 cm wide with a narrow stem (stipe) 1-2 mm thick. The leaf blade 3 to 4-pinnate and the leaflets are small and nearly round. Their abaxial (lower) surface is concave and densely covered with cilia and lanceolate-linear scales, and their adaxial (top) surface is glabrous. The leaf viewed from above has the general appearance of a flat array of tiny green pebbles, an appearance that is shared by several other Myriopteris species, some with overlapping ranges including Myriopteris covillei and Myriopteris intertexta.

Range and habitat
Myriopteris wootonii is native to the southwestern United States and northern Mexico. It grows in sun on rocky outcrops in mountains at 1600 to 1800 meters elevation.

Taxonomy
Based on plastid DNA sequence analysis, Myriopteris wootonii is very closely related to ''Myriopteris fendleri.

References

Works cited

wootonii
Flora of the Southwestern United States
Flora of Northwestern Mexico